The Banco del Giro (Venetian: Banco del Ziro), also Banco Giro or Bancogiro, sometimes referred to in English as the Bank of Venice, was a public bank created by the Republic of Venice. It was governed by a magistrate called the Depositario.

History
An early proposal for a banco per Comune, a public municipal bank that would complement the operation of Venice's private banks, was made to the Venetian Senate by Senator Giovanni Dolfin in 1356. A comparable proposal was made again in 1374 by a committee headed by Michele Morosini. In 1587 the Republic founded the Banco della Piazza di Rialto to allow easy transactions' settlement without handling of metallic money.

The Banco del Giro was established in 1619 and its administration was entrusted to the Senate, which appointed the Depositario from among its members. In 1637, the Banco di Rialto was merged into the Banco del Giro following financial difficulties.

The bank ceased its activity in 1800, following the fall of the Republic, and was finally liquidated in 1806 under the Napoleonic Kingdom of Italy.

Legacy

One of the sotoportegos of the Rialto Square is still known as Sotoportego del Banco Giro.

See also
 Bank of Venice
 Taula de canvi
 Bank of Saint George
 Bank of Amsterdam
 Hamburger Bank

Notes

Former central banks
16th-century establishments in the Republic of Venice